Harzel Kuh (also Romanized as Harzel Kūh; also known as Harzeleh Kūh) is a village in Sardar-e Jangal Rural District, Sardar-e Jangal District, Fuman County, Gilan Province, Iran. At the 2006 census, its population was 47, in 12 families.

References 

Populated places in Fuman County